Ana Barros (born 5 September 1969) is a Portuguese former breaststroke swimmer. She competed in two events at the 1992 Summer Olympics.

References

External links
 

1969 births
Living people
Portuguese female breaststroke swimmers
Olympic swimmers of Portugal
Swimmers at the 1992 Summer Olympics
Swimmers from Lisbon